A step ( ) was a Roman unit of length equal to 2½ Roman feet or ½ Roman pace.

The Byzantine pace (bḗma) was an adaption of the Roman step, a distance of 2½ Greek feet.

See also
 Pace (unit)
 Roman and Byzantine units
 US customary units

References

Units of length
Ancient Roman units of measurement